Louie is an American comedy-drama television series created, written, directed by, and starring stand-up comedian Louis C.K. The series premiered on FX on June 29, 2010 and ended on May 28, 2015, with a total of 61 episodes over the course of 5 seasons.

Series overview

Episodes

Season 1 (2010)

Season 2 (2011)

Season 3 (2012)

Season 4 (2014)

Season 5 (2015)

References

External links
 

Lists of American comedy-drama television series episodes